Beta Alpha Psi is an international honor society for accounting, finance and information systems students attending universities accredited by the Association to Advance Collegiate Schools of Business or the European Quality Improvement System.

It was founded on February 12, 1919, at the University of Illinois at Urbana-Champaign and is currently headquartered in Durham, North Carolina, in the United States. The organization has over 300 chapters on college and university campuses with over 300,000 members worldwide.

Objectives
Beta Alpha Psi encourages and recognizes scholastic and professional excellence in the business information field, promotes the study and practice of accounting, finance and information systems, and provides opportunities for self-development, service and association among members and practicing professionals. It "strives to encourage a sense of ethical, social, and public responsibility". The organization also promotes the development of technical and professional skills that are used to complement the university education, philanthropic activities, and interaction between students, faculty and professionals. Beta Alpha Psi's objectives are accomplished through the activities of each chapter respectively. Each chapter receives financial funding for these activities through sponsorship of various public and private firms.

History
On April 17, 1896, the New York legislature established the Certified Public Accountant (CPA) designation. This designation in business encouraged a greater focus on accounting and commerce knowledge, and Beta Alpha Psi was formed in 1919 to promote the CPA rank on college campuses. Two years after its founding, all of the existing U.S. states had adopted CPA regulations.

Beta Alpha Psi's beginnings relate to Hiram Scovill, class of 1908, an accounting professor, during his return to the University of Illinois in 1908. Several new honor societies and professional fraternities that had formed a few years before Scovill's return introduced students to the benefits of professional organizations.

Scovill and his junior colleague A. C. Littleton formed an accounting club on campus in 1917. Beta Alpha Psi emerged two years later. The first members were six students from Professor Scovill's CPA course. The organization was founded on the three basic principles of scholarship, practicality, and sociability, and its initial objective was to stimulate cooperation and interest in accounting. One of its main purposes was to encourage and foster service as the basis of the accounting profession and to secure the highest ethical ideals in the practice of accountancy. On this multifaceted base, eleven students were initiated as active members of the organization on February 12, 1919. Professor Scovill was initiated as an honorary member.

In the original constitution for the University of Illinois chapter, the initiation fee was $10 and dues were an additional $2 per semester. Any member who was absent from a function without first being excused was charged 25 cents. Section I, Article IV, of the original constitution stated that any male person who was registered in third-year accounting, who contemplated a continuance in accounting work, and who had a junior class standing as shown by his college records was eligible for membership in the organization.

Nine of the eleven members became CPAs. By 1939, only one of the original eleven members, the first president Russell Morrison, was a practicing CPA. Morrison was actively involved in the American Accounting Association. In 1964, he, along with eight other leading accounting professors, was selected to serve on the "Committee to Prepare a Statement of Basic Accounting Theory", which provided major contributions to American accounting thought. In February 1921, Beta Alpha Psi officially became a national organization after it adopted a national constitution. Less than nine years later, the organization boasted 900 members, and on November 8, 1950, Jeannie Skelton, the first female member of Beta Alpha Psi, was inducted into the Miami University (Ohio) chapter.

Beta Alpha Psi's logo consists of three different aspects: the emblem, the rising sun, and the crossed keys. The emblem is used to promote the promise of careers for financial information professionals. The rising sun represents the professionals who continuously rise higher. The crossed keys symbolize the knowledge Beta Alpha Psi provides that will unlock the doors for the financial world. Together these three aspects represent what Beta Alpha Psi is about. The Greek letters Beta Alpha Psi represent scholarship, social responsibility, and practicality respectively.

International presence
Beta Alpha Psi continues to grow as new chapters are installed internationally. Outside the United States, local chapters operate in Australia, New Zealand and Saudi Arabia.

Organizational structure
Beta Alpha Psi is governed by a constitution and by laws. It is managed by the Board of Directors, which consists of thirteen financial information professionals or professors of accounting, finance or information systems, the Professional Partners chair, and two alumni representatives. The alumni representatives are recent graduates who were active in their Beta Alpha Psi chapters.

The organization relies on funding to support its activities. Beta Alpha Psi receives a portion of its funding from charter maintenance fees and an initiation fee. The initiation fee is a one-time fee and is paid upon acceptance into the organization. A majority of the organization's funding comes from contributions from industry, consulting, and professional service firms. They include but are not limited to donations from alumni of the organization.

Beta Alpha Psi's Professional Partners consists of prominent professional accountants who are active in public accounting, industry, and government. Members serve three-year terms. The Partners provides the Board of Directors independent, external advice on and assistance in both the routine operations and the special projects of the organization.

The International Chapter is composed of all faculty advisors, student presidents, and past and present members of Beta Alpha Psi. This body holds a meeting every year and provides advice and assistance to the Board of Directors. Local chapters are composed of the students and the faculty members at each university. Students guide each chapter's activities while faculty advisors mentor the chapters and provide a liaison between the members and other faculty. But different local chapters operate in diverse ways. While some chapters are organized as accounting honor societies or others operate as financial information fraternities.

Establishing a chapter 
There are several requirements that must be met before starting a chapter:
 Accreditation by the Association to Advance Collegiate Schools of Business International or European Foundation for Management Development/European Quality Improvement System, or be in the candidacy stage for accreditation.
 A sufficient number (usually ten or more) of interested and qualified accounting, finance or information systems students to demonstrate sustainability of chapter activities. Furthermore, all potential members must meet the eligibility requirements stated in the International Bylaws.
 An accounting, finance or information systems faculty member who is willing and able to serve as faculty advisor.
 Support of the accounting, finance, or information systems faculty and department chairs, as well as the business school dean. It is strongly encouraged for all petitioning chapters to have ongoing funding from the school’s administration.
Petitioning applications can be submitted at any time during the year. If the petition is approved, the chapter will be eligible for installation after 60 days from the date of approval. Before the installation can be scheduled, the petitioning chapter must submit certain fees, names of charter members, and the address which installation materials should be mailed to.

Admission requirements
In order to become a part of Beta Alpha Psi, students must be invited to join by the local chapter at the university they attend, and they are required to meet various requirements.

The minimum requirements for eligibility to be elected as a pledge, though a chapter can set stricter requirements, include:
Declare an academic major in accounting, finance, or information systems
Pay an annual membership fee
Complete at least one year of courses at the collegiate level (30 semester hours or equivalent)
Maintain a grade point average of 3.5 (where an A is equal to a 4.0)

A separate set of requirements is set for election to membership, including:
Declare an academic major in accounting, finance, or information systems (or have stated an intention to declare a concentration in accounting, finance, or information systems)
Complete two years of collegiate courses and at least one upper-level course beyond the business core (for transfer students, the most recent qualifying course must be at an institution accredited by the Association to Advance Collegiate Schools of Business- or European Quality Improvement System
Maintain a cumulative grade point average of 3.0 in upper-level courses of their declared major beyond the business core; and
Maintain a 3.0 cumulative grade point average, or
Rank within the top 35% of their university class, or
Attain a 3.25 cumulative grade point average on the most recently completed 30 semester hours

Notable alumni
The following alumni have distinguished themselves in business or in service to Beta Alpha Psi.
Arthur E. Andersen, founder of accounting firm Arthur Andersen.
T. Coleman Andrews, entrepreneur, Commissioner of Internal Revenue 1953–1955; 1956 Independent candidate for President of the United States
Yuji Ijiri, distinguished researcher in accounting and economics, president of the American Accounting Association (1982–1983), and inductee into the Accounting Hall of Fame
William Andrew Paton, founder of the American Accounting Association and its journal, The Accounting Review
Isai Alvarado, professional Super Smash Bros. player, president of chapter at San Jose State University
Eugene Lee, currently active sports agent representing players in the National Football League
Mary Ann Tobin, former Kentucky Auditor of Public Accounts

Active and Petitioning Chapters
Active and Petitioning Chapters as of October 26, 2020

Notes

External links
Beta Alpha Psi website

Honor societies
Accounting in the United States
Student organizations established in 1919
Former members of Professional Fraternity Association
1919 establishments in Illinois